Thomas G. Lyons (May 24, 1931 – January 12, 2007) was an American politician and member of the Democratic Party active in Chicago.

Biography
Lyons was born May 24, 1931 on the northwest side of Chicago. He attended Our Lady of Victory Grammar School and Campion High School. He attended college at Loyola University and earned a law degree from Loyola Law School. Lyons served in the United States Army Rangers 1954 through 1956. As of 1964, he was a Captain in the United States Army Reserve. Lyons joined the Chicago Police Department as a patrolman in 1953 and resigned in 1957 upon his admission to the Bar. During his legal career, he served as Chief of the Law Division of Cook County Assessor's Office, and chief of three departments in the Office of Attorney General of Illinois, and as a partner at O'Keefe, Ashenden, O'Brien, Hanson, Lyons & Associates. In 1958, Lyons married Ruth Tobin in Mitchell, South Dakota.

Illinois Senate
In 1964, Lyons was elected to the Illinois Senate from the 10th district defeating Republican candidate Elroy C. Sandquist Jr. He was chosen the best new member of the Illinois Senate in 1965 and selected by Rutgers University as an outstanding young legislator in 1966. Served as chairman of the Illinois Constitution Study Commission and Secretary of the Governor's Revenue Study Committee. Lyons lost re-election in 1966, in part for his support for a statewide fair housing laws, similar to what would become Titles VIII through IX of the Civil Rights Act of 1968.

Lyons was elected delegate to the 1970 Illinois Constitutional Convention and unanimously selected to be the Vice President of the Convention. Lyons was elected to the Illinois Senate in 1970 from the 15th district and served another term in the Illinois Senate. Lyons left the Illinois Senate to run for Illinois Attorney General; losing to incumbent William J. Scott. Howard W. Carroll, a member of the Illinois House of Representatives, defeated former State Senator Walter Duda's comeback bid.

Post-Senate career
In 1968, Lyons was elected to the position of Democratic Committeeman for the 45th ward, and from 1990 until his death he served as Chair of the Cook County Democratic Party from 1990–2007 and as 45th Ward Democratic Committeeman for many years. President Bill Clinton appointed Lyons to the American Battle Monuments Commission. He died in January 2007. He was succeeded as Chairman of the Cook County Democratic Party by Joe Berrios.

References 

1931 births
2007 deaths
20th-century American politicians
Chicago Police Department officers
Democratic Party Illinois state senators
Loyola University Chicago alumni
Loyola University Chicago School of Law alumni
Politicians from Chicago
United States Army reservists
United States Army Rangers
United States Army officers
Military personnel from Illinois